Yousef Muftah (Arabic:يوسف مفتاح) (born 16 May 1988) is a Qatari footballer. He currently plays for Al-Arabi.

External links

References

Qatari footballers
1988 births
Living people
El Jaish SC players
Al-Wakrah SC players
Al-Gharafa SC players
Al-Arabi SC (Qatar) players
Qatar Stars League players
Association football fullbacks